Vin Choi Kay-Chun (born 23 May 1984) is a Hong Kong actor under TVB.

Biography
After graduating from high school in 2001, Vin entered a contest hosted by TVB Weekly and won first place. He enrolled in the 18th TVB artists training course in 2002 and took on a few tiny roles.

Vin's first major role happened in the series Sunshine Heartbeat, where he played Fong Lik.

In 2007, Vin took on another major role in the series Best Selling Secrets as Luk Chit.

Filmography

TV series

TV Show Host
After School ICU 放學ICU (TVB)

References
Best Selling Secrets Cast

External links
Official TVB Blog

Hong Kong male television actors
1984 births
Living people
TVB actors
21st-century Hong Kong male actors